Otto Waldis (born Otto Glucksmann-Blum, May 20, 1901 – March 25, 1974) was an Austrian-American character actor in films and television from the 1930s through the 1960s. He was also billed as Otto Blum.

Years in Germany 
Waldis was born Otto Glucksmann-Blum in 1901 in Vienna. He was a student during World War I and initially studied to be a naval engineer. When Germany had no navy after the war, he shifted his attention to acting in the 1920s. Rudolph Schildkraut saw him perform and encouraged him to pursue a theatrical career. Billed as Otto Valdis, he performed Shakespeare and classic German plays. He also directed plays.

Waldis began made his film debut in a small role in director Fritz Lang's classic thriller M (1931) starring Peter Lorre. After he began acting regularly in films, he had the lead in The Broken Pitcher, which received first prize in an international competition in 1934.

Emigration and work in Hollywood 

The Jewish actor fled from Europe because of the persecution from the Nazi Regime. He and his wife left Austria and arrived in Birmingham, Alabama, in June 1940. He worked as a photographer in Birmingham.

Waldis became a familiar character actor often appearing in B movies and his roles were sometimes uncredited. He also appeared regularly on television during the 1950s and '60s. Waldis also occasionally acted on stage.

Personal life and death 
Waldis married Margaret Vieth, an opera singer, in 1935. He died of a heart attack in 1974 at the age of 72.

Selected filmography

M (1931) – (uncredited)
Kinder vor Gericht (1931) – Ein Gefangener
Die Koffer des Herrn O.F. (1931)
The Exile (1947) – Jan
Call Northside 777 (1948) – Boris Siskovich (uncredited)
Letter from an Unknown Woman (1948) – Concierge
Berlin Express (1948) – Kessler
A Foreign Affair (1948) – Inspector (uncredited)
The Fighting O'Flynn (1949) – Gen. van Dronk
The Lovable Cheat (1949) – Bailiff
I Was a Male War Bride (1949) – Minor Role (scenes deleted)
Love Happy (1949) – Ivan – Assassin in Grunion's Office (uncredited)
Border Incident (1949) – Fritz
Bagdad (1949) – Marengo
Women from Headquarters (1950) – Joe Calla
Spy Hunt (1950) – Gormand
Dark City (1950) – Benowski (uncredited)
Bird of Paradise (1951) – Skipper
Night Into Morning (1951) – Dr. Franz Niemoller
Secrets of Monte Carlo (1951) – Louis Gunther
The Whip Hand (1951) – Dr. Wilhelm Bucholtz
Unknown World (1951) – Dr. Max A. Bauer
5 Fingers (1952) – Pullman Porter (uncredited)
Anything Can Happen (1952) – Sandro
The Black Castle (1952) – Krantz – the innkeeper
The Congregation (1952)
Rogue's March (1953) – Alex
The Stars Are Singing (1953) – Ship's Captain Goslak
Rebel City (1953) – Spain – the Jeweler
The Robe (1953) – Slave Dealer (uncredited)
Flight to Tangier (1953) – Wisil (uncredited)
Prince Valiant (1954) – Patch-Eye (uncredited)
Knock on Wood (1954) – Brodnik
The Iron Glove (1954) – King George I (uncredited)
Port of Hell (1954) – Snyder
Sincerely Yours (1955) – Prof. Zwolinski (uncredited)
Artists and Models (1955) – Kurt
Running Wild (1955) – Leta's Father
Desert Sands (1955) – Gabin
Man from Del Rio (1956) – Tom Jordan (uncredited)
Ride the High Iron (1956) – Yanusz Danielchik
The Night the World Exploded (1957) – Professor Hagstrom (uncredited)
Attack of the 50 Foot Woman (1958) – Dr. Heinrich Von Loeb
The Blue Angel (1959) – Policeman (uncredited)
Pier 5, Havana (1959) – Schluss
Judgment at Nuremberg (1961) – Pohl
The Phantom of Soho (1964) – Wilhelm Grover, man with birthmark
Freddy in the Wild West (1964) – Old Joe
Move (1970) – (uncredited) (final film role)

Waldis also made several guest appearances on television including roles in My Little Margie, The Adventures of Superman, General Electric Theater, Lassie,  Maverick, Alfred Hitchcock Presents, Perry Mason, Peter Gunn, Playhouse 90, Have Gun - Will Travel, The Untouchables, 77 Sunset Strip,  Wagon Train, Lawman, Ben Casey, Hogan's Heroes,  Mannix and Gomer Pyle, USMC.

References

External links
 

1901 births
1974 deaths
20th-century American male actors
American male film actors
American people of Austrian descent